Grand Prix of Sochi Mayor was a men's one-day cycle race, held in Russia in 2015. It was rated by the UCI as 1.2 and formed part of the 2015 UCI Europe Tour.

Winners

References

Cycle races in Russia
UCI Europe Tour races
Recurring sporting events established in 2015
2015 establishments in Russia
Recurring sporting events disestablished in 2015
2015 disestablishments in Russia
Sports competitions in Sochi